Naja Marie Aidt (born 24 December 1963) is a Danish-language poet and writer.

Biography
Aidt was born in Aasiaat, Greenland, and was brought up partly in Greenland and partly in the Vesterbro area of Copenhagen. In 1991, she published her first book of poetry, Så længe jeg er ung (While I'm Still Young). Since 1993, she has been a full-time writer. In 1994, Aidt was awarded the Danish Fund for the Endowment of the Arts 3-year bursary.

Aidt won the Nordic Council's Literature Prize in 2008 for her short stories collection. Bavian (Baboon, 2006), Bavian also earned her the Danish Kritikerprisen for 2007.

Bibliography 
 Har døden taget noget fra dig så giv det tilbage (2017), Gyldendal; Translated as When Death Takes Something From You Give It Back by Denise Newman (2019)
 OMINA (2016) co-authored by Mette Moestrup, Gyldendal – poetry
 Frit flet (2014), co-authored by Mette Moestrup and Line Knutzon, Gyldendal
 Sten saks papir (2012), Gyldendal – novel; Translated as Rock, Paper, Scissors by K. E. Semmell (2015)
 Alting Blinker (2009), Gyldendal – poetry
Poesibog (2008), Gyldendal – poetry collection
 Bavian (2006), Gyldendal – short stories; Translated as Baboon by Denise Newman (2014)
 Balladen om Bianca (2002), Gyldendal 
 Siska (2000), Cafe Teatret – drama
 Rejse for en fremmed, digte (1999), Gyldendal – poetry
 Tjenende ånder (1998), Radio-Teatret – radio play
 Blæs på Odysseus (1998), Thorvaldsens Museum – songs for choir
 Fra digterens hånd (1996), Borgens Forlag – poetry
 Omstændigheder (1995), Gyldendal – short stories
 Huset overfor (1995), Gyldendal – poetry
 Tilgang (1995), Gyldendal – short stories
 Det tredje landskab (1994), Gyldendal – poetry
 Vandmærket (1993), Gyldendal – short stories
 Som englene flyver (1993) Gyldendal – short stories
Den blomstrende have (1993), Gyldendal – short stories
 Et vanskeligt møde (1992), Gyldendal – poetry
 Så længe jeg er ung (1991), Gyldendal – poetry

Prizes and grants 
Aidt has received several grants from Statens Kunstfond; other prizes include:
 1993: Gyldendal's Book prize (Gyldendals boglegat) (25,000 DKK to buy books for)
 1996: Martin Andersen Nexø Prize. 
 1996: Herman Bangs Mindelegat.
 2004: Beatrice Prize
 2007: Kritikerprisen (Danish Critics Prize for Literature)
 2008: Nordic Council's Literature Prize
 2011: Søren Gyldendal Prize
 2020: Det Danske Akademis Den Store Pris
 2022: Swedish Academy Nordic Prize

References

External links 

 

1963 births
Living people
Danish women poets
Danish women novelists
Nordic Council Literature Prize winners
Danish women short story writers
21st-century Danish novelists
21st-century Danish poets
21st-century Danish women writers
20th-century Danish dramatists and playwrights
Danish women dramatists and playwrights
People from Qaasuitsup
20th-century Danish women writers
Danish expatriates in the United States
20th-century Danish poets
20th-century Danish short story writers
21st-century Danish short story writers
Greenlandic writers
Greenlandic women writers
Greenlandic poets
Greenlandic women poets